Listen Here may refer to:
 Listen Here (Freddie McCoy album)
 Listen Here (Jasmine Rae album)
 Listen Here (Roseanna Vitro album)
 Listen Here! (Eddie Palmieri album)
 Listen Here! (sampler album), a sampler album released by Transatlantic Records